The 1887 St George's, Hanover Square by-election was held on 9 February 1887 following the resignation of the incumbent Conservative MP, Lord Algernon Percy. Percy vacated his Parliamentary seat by being appointed Steward of the Manor of Northstead on 31 January 1887.

Candidates
The Liberal Unionist candidate was George Goschen, 1st Viscount Goschen. Goschen was Chancellor of the Exchequer. He had voted against Gladstone's Home Rule Bill in 1886 and became a Liberal Unionist. He subsequently lost his seat at Edinburgh East at the 1886 general election.

Lord Randolph Churchill resigned as Chancellor of the Exchequer on 22 December 1886. The Marquess of Salisbury appointed Goschen to the post on 14 January 1887. He became the sole Liberal Unionist in an otherwise Conservative government.

Goschen was therefore Chancellor outside the House of Commons. He first contested a by-election at Liverpool Exchange to return to the House, but was defeated by seven votes.

Following this defeat, Goschen received offers from Conservative Members of Parliament to resign their seats for Goschen.

Lord Algernon Percy put his safely Conservative seat at St George's Hanover Square at Goschen's disposal, an offer which Goschen accepted.

The Liberal Party candidate was James Haysman. Haysman had contested Brentford in the 1885 general election, the 1886 general election, and the December 1886 by-election.

Result

References

St George's, Hanover Square by-election
St George's, Hanover Square,1887
1887 in England
1887 in London
St George's, Hanover Square,1887